Quercus championii is an uncommon species of tree in the family Fagaceae. It has been found only  in  southern China, in the Provinces of Fujian, Guangdong, Guangxi, Hainan, Taiwan, and Yunnan. It is placed in subgenus Cerris, section Cyclobalanopsis.

Quercus championii is a tree up to 20 meters tall, with a trunk up to 100 cm in diameter, grayish-brown twigs, and leaves as much as 13 cm long.

It was described from material collected in Hong Kong by John George Champion.

References

External links

championii
Trees of China
Plants described in 1854
Trees of Taiwan